This article lists rulers of Montenegro, from the establishment of Duklja to the Kingdom of Montenegro which merged into the Kingdom of Serbia in 1918.

Medieval Duklja (Dioclea)

Non-hereditary archons
 Petar (late 10th century)
 Vladimir (c. 1000 –1016)
 Dragimir (1016 –1018)

House of Vojislavljević
 Vojislav I (1018 – c. 1043)
 Neda (1043—1046)
 Gojislav (c. 1046)
 Mihailo I (c. 1046 – 1081)
 Konstantin (1081–1101)
 Mihailo II (1101–1102)
 Dobroslav II (1102)
 Kočopar (1102–1103)
 Vladimir (1103–1114)
 Đorđe I (1114–1118)
 Grubeša (1118–1125)
 Đorđe I (1125–1131)
 Gradihna (1131–1148)
 Radoslav (1146–1148/62)
 Mihailo III (1162–1186)
 Desislava (c. 1186–1189)

Zeta, crown land

House of Nemanjić
Vukan (1189-1208)
Đorđe (1208-1216)
Radoslav (1216-1243)
Beloslava (1243-1267)
Uroš (1267-1276)
Jelena (1276-1309) 
Stefan (1309-1314)
Konstantin (1314-1322)
Dušan (1322-1331)

Non-hereditary governors
Đuraš Ilijić (1331-1362)

Principality of Zeta/Montenegro

House of Balšić
 Balša I (1356–1362)
 Đurađ I (1362–1378)
 Balša II (1378–1385)
 Đurađ II (1385–1403)
 Balša III (1403–1421)

House of Crnojević
 Đurađ and Aleksa (1403–1435)
 Gojčin (1435-1451)
 Stefan I (1451–1465)
 Ivan I (1465–1490)
 Đurađ IV (1490–1496)
 Stefan II (1496–1498)
 Ivan II (1498–1515)
 Đurađ V (1515–1516)

Prince-Bishopric of Montenegro

Non-hereditary Metropolitans
Vavila (Bishop from 1493) (1516–1520)
German II (1520–1530)
Pavle (1530–1532)
Vasilije I (1532–1540)
Nikodim (1540)
Romi (1540–1559)
Makarije (1560–1561)
Ruvim I (1561–1569)
Pahomije II (1569–1579)
Gerasim (1575–1582)
Venijamin (1582–1591)
Nikanor and Stefan (1591–1593)
Ruvim II (1593–1636)
Mardarije I (1639–1649)
Visarion I (1649–1659)
Mardarije II (1659–1673)
Ruvim III (1673–1685)
Vasilije II (1685)
Visarion II (1685–1692)
Sava I (1694–1697)

Hereditary Metropolitans

Principality of Montenegro (1852–1910)

House of Petrović-Njegoš

Kingdom of Montenegro (1910–1918)

House of Petrović-Njegoš

Pretenders to the Montenegrin throne since 1918

House of Petrović-Njegoš
Nikola I Petrović-Njegoš (26 November 1918 – 1 March 1921)
Danilo Petrović-Njegoš (1 March 1921 – 7 March 1921)
Mihajlo Petrović-Njegoš (7 March 1921 – 24 March 1986)
Nikola Petrović-Njegoš (24 March 1986 – present)

Family tree

{|  class="wikitable mw-collapsible mw-collapsed"
|-
| 
|-
|

-}

See also
List of heads of state of Montenegro, for a comprehensive list of Montenegrin heads of state since 1696.

 
Rulers
Montenegro